Andrej Martin and Hans Podlipnik won the title, beating Rogério Dutra Silva and João Souza 6–3, 6–4

Seeds

Draw

Draw

References
 Main Draw

Lima Challenger - Doubles
2015 Doubles